Maurice I (– ) was Count of Oldenburg from 1169 through 1211. He was the son of Count Christian I of Oldenburg and his wife Kunigunde.

Marriage and issue
He married Salome, the daughter of Otto II, Count of Wickrath, and had: 
 Christian II, Count of Oldenburg 1211-1233
 Otto I, Count of Oldenburg 1209-1251

External links
 www.genealogie-mittelalter.de

Counts of Oldenburg
1140s births
1210s deaths
Year of birth uncertain
Year of death uncertain